Astroblepus phelpsi is a species of catfish of the family Astroblepidae. It can be found on Lake Maracaibo in Venezuela.

Named in honor of businessman and ornithologist William H. Phelps, of Caracas, a “well-known leader in furthering the development of the biological sciences in Venezuela” (we assume name honors Phelps, Sr. (1875-1965), but it could also apply to William H. Phelps, Jr. (1902-1988), who continued his father’s commercial and ornithological work in Venezuela.

References

Bibliography
Eschmeyer, William N., ed. 1998. Catalog of Fishes. Special Publication of the Center for Biodiversity Research and Information, num. 1, vol. 1–3. California Academy of Sciences. San Francisco, California, United States. 2905. .

Astroblepus
Taxa named by Leonard Peter Schultz
Fish described in 1944
Fish of Venezuela